KwaZulu-Natal Inland are a South African first-class cricket team who are based in Pietermaritzburg. They form part of the Dolphins franchise and are one of five South African associate teams. Their home games are played at Pietermaritzburg Oval.

KwaZulu-Natal Inland were granted first-class status in 2006 and took part in the 2006-07 South African Airways Provincial Three-Day Challenge. They continue to take part in the Provincial Three-Day Challenge tournament and the Provincial One-Day Competition.

The KZNICU’s jurisdiction covers by far the largest landmass in KZN, stretching from Zululand in the north to East Griqualand in the south, and the provincial boundaries of Mpumalanga, Free State, Lesotho and the Eastern Cape in the west, and in the east, a line following the eastern boundaries of the Sisonke, uMgungundlovu, Umzinyathi and Zululand district municipalities.

For ease of administration, the KZNICU jurisdiction closely follows the district municipality demarcations of Zululand, Umzinyathi, Amajuba, uThukhela, Sisonke and uMgundundlovu.

Each of the six districts is represented by sub-unions that are affiliated to the KZNICU. The set-up is dominated by the Maritzburg Cricket Association and Midlands Cricket Union (uMgungundlovu), while the East Griqualand Cricket Union and the Southern District Cricket Union comprise Sisonke, Northern District Cricket Union (Amajuba), Umzinyathi Cricket Association (Umzinyathi), Northern Natal Cricket Board (uThukela) and the Northern District Cricket Union in Zululand make up the other sub-unions.

Honours
 South African Airways Provincial Three-Day Challenge (0) - 
 South African Airways Provincial One-Day Challenge (0) - 

The Hollywoodbets KZN Inland team won the 2017 Africa T20 Cup. They defeated Free State in the final.

Squad
In April 2021, Cricket South Africa confirmed the following squad ahead of the 2021–22 season.

 Cameron Delport
 Tshepang Dithole
 Keith Dudgeon
 Michael Erlank
 Tian Koekemoer
 Kurtlyn Mannikam
 Andile Mokgakane
 Thula Ngcobo
 Zakariya Paruk
 Luke Schlemmer
 Cameron Shekleton

References

Sources
 South African Cricket Annual – various editions
 Wisden Cricketers' Almanack – various editions

External links
 KwaZulu-Natal Inland Cricket Union website
 First-class matches played by KwaZulu-Natal Inland

South African first-class cricket teams
Cricket in KwaZulu-Natal